John Findlater Clements (1819 – 2 September 1884) was an Irish-born Australian politician.

He was born in Balbriggan to Royal Navy lieutenant Hanbury Clements and Margaret Ingham. He migrated to New South Wales around 1833 and became a pastoralist, with over 160,000 acres in the Lachlan River area. In 1859 he was elected to the New South Wales Legislative Assembly for Bathurst, but he was defeated in 1860. On 8 March 1865 he married Charlotte Palmer, with whom he had four children. Clements died at Bathurst in 1884.

References

 

1819 births
1884 deaths
Members of the New South Wales Legislative Assembly
19th-century Australian politicians